The 2010–11 Copa Federación de España was the 18th staging of the Copa Federación de España, a knockout competition for Spanish football clubs in Segunda División B and Tercera División.

The competition began on 4 August 2010 and ended with the finals on 31 March and 14 April 2011, where Puertollano became champion after defeating Lemona 4–3 on aggregate.

Autonomous Communities tournaments

Andalusia tournament

Final

|}

Aragon tournament

Quarter-finals

|}

Semifinals

|}

Final

|}

Asturias tournament

Qualifying tournament

Group A

Group B

Group C

Group D

Semifinals

|}

Final

|}

Balearic Islands tournament

Semifinals

|}

Final

|}

Canary Islands tournament

First round

|}

Semi-final

|}

Final

|}

Cantabria tournament

First round

|}

Semifinals

|}

Final

|}

Castile and León tournament
Arandina was the only team inscribed in the competition, so it was considered the Regional champion.

Castile-La Mancha tournament

Semifinals

|}

Final

|}

Catalonia tournament

Final

|}

Euskadi tournament

Semifinals

|}

Final

|}

Extremadura tournament

First round

|}

Second round

|}

Semifinals

|}

Final

|}

Galicia tournament

First round

|}

Semifinals

|}

Final

|}

La Rioja tournament

Finals

Madrid tournament

Qualifying tournament

Group 1

Group 2

Final

|}

Murcia tournament

First round

|}

Quarter-finals

|}

Semifinals

|}

Final

|}

Navarre tournament

Final

|}

Valencia tournament

Semifinal

|}

Final

|}

National tournament

National Qualifying round

|}

Round of 32

|}

Round of 16

|}

Quarterfinals

|}

Semifinals

|}

Final

|}

Notes

2010-11
3
2010–11 Segunda División B
2010–11 Tercera División